Four ships of the French Navy have borne the name of Espoir, in honour of hope.

French ship named Espoir 
 , a  brig-sloop (brig-aviso in French nomenclature)
  (1795), a storeship
  (1939), a police patrol boat
  (Q167, 1931), a  submarine

See also 
 
  and

Notes and references

Notes

References

Bibliography 
 
 

French Navy ship names